Kanazawa City General Gymnasium is an arena in Kanazawa, Ishikawa, Japan. It is the home arena of the Kanazawa Samuraiz of the B.League, Japan's professional basketball league.

References

Basketball venues in Japan
Indoor arenas in Japan
Kanazawa Samuraiz
Sports venues in Ishikawa Prefecture
Buildings and structures in Kanazawa, Ishikawa
Sports venues completed in 1985
1985 establishments in Japan